Islamic Azad University, Central Tehran Branch (Daneshgah-e Âzad-e Eslâmi-ye Vahed-e Tehran Mirkâzi) is a private research university located in Tehran, Iran. Founded in 1982, Central Tehran is the flagship institution of the universities affiliated with Islamic Azad University system.
The university is the oldest, the largest and the top university among all branches of Islamic Azad University academic organization, established in 1982, originally as the Islamic Azad University of Tehran.
It offers approximately 488 undergraduate and graduate degree programs in a wide range of disciplines such as sciences, engineering, art, architecture, humanities and social sciences.

History

Establishment 
Islamic Azad University Central Tehran Branch is the very first branch established under the university system which is known as Islamic Azad University, so its history can be traced back to the foundation of the university.

Akbar Hashemi Rafsanjani sought to establish a private university to address the challenges posed during early years of Iranian Revolution -such as Cultural Revolution- and to meet increasing demands of secondary-school graduates for higher education in Iran. On the sidelines of an Islamic Republican Party conference, Rafsanjani mooted the idea with Abdollah Jasbi, who supported and developed the plan to establish Islamic Azad University.
Islamic Azad University Central Tehran Branch is the very first branch established under the university system which is known as Islamic Azad University, so its history can be traced back to the foundation of the university.
On its early days, the university lacked sufficient funds and facilities to operate, sorely opening relying on donations made by people and government. The initial endowment was about 100,000 Rials.

Jasbi rented No. 155 building in Forsat Shirazi St., while Nassir Shekarriz and Mahmoud Latifipour – who were in charge as Chancellor and Vice Chancellor respectively – rented the sixth floor of a building located in Enqelab St., Felestin St. in order to hold an entrance exam in 1982. This university began as the Islamic Azad University of Tehran when it opened the doors to about 200 students, offering six majors in bachelor's degree and two in associate degree.
Soon after, the whole building in Enqelab St. was purchased from Mostazafan Foundation of Islamic Revolution and became the university's first property. (Current Faculty of Arts and Architecture)

Chancellors

Campus 
The university has 13 Faculties:

The university has three campuses:

Schools and departments

Programs by subject:

Arts & humanities
Clinical, pre-clinical & health (medical sciences)
Life sciences
Social sciences
Engineering & technology
Physical sciences

Enrollments

In academic year of 2021-2022

Faculty of Engineering

Programs and majors
In academic year of 2021-2022:
Aerospace engineering (BS)
Biomedical engineering (BS, MS, PhD)
Chemical engineering (BS, MS, PhD)
Civil engineering (BS, MS, PhD)
Computer engineering (BS, MS, PhD)
Electrical engineering (BS, MS, PhD)
Energy engineering (MS)
Environmental engineering (BS, MS)
Industrial engineering (BS, MS, PhD)
Information technology engineering (MS)
Materials engineering (BS, MS)
Mechanical engineering (BS, MS, PhD)
Mechatronics engineering (MS)
Mining engineering (BS, MS)
Nuclear engineering (BS, MS, PhD)
Petroleum engineering (BS, MS)
Polymer engineering (BS)
Sports engineering (BS)
Textile engineering (BS)

Sub-program

Department of Electrical Engineering

Department of Biomedical Engineering

Department of Computer Engineering

Department of Nuclear Engineering

Department of Civil Engineering

Department of Mechanical Engineering
Department of Industrial Engineering
Department of Chemical Engineering

Faculty of Science

Department of Mathematics, Computer Science and Statistics

It offers the following programs:

Department of Biology
Department of Chemistry
Department of Physics

Admissions 
The university received 35,317 applications for the Fall 2011 undergraduate class, making it the university with the most freshmen applicants among all branches of Islamic Azad University.
In 2013, a total number of 11,789 and 6,061 applications were received for undergraduate and graduate programs respectively.

Rankings
Islamic World Science Citation Database
2011: third among Islamic Azad University campuses
SCImago rankings
2012: International rank : 231,   National rank : 1 
2013: International rank : 87,   National rank : 1

Notable alumni and people

Faculty 

 Zahra Rahnavard – Iranian Reformist Politician
 Mohammad-Javad Haghshenas – Iranian Reformist journalist and Political activist
 Amir Mohebbian – Iranian Conservative Politician
 Mansour Falamaki – Iranian Science and Culture Hall of Famer in architecture
 Hassan Riahi – Iranian Science and Culture Hall of Famer in music and composer of National Anthem of the Islamic Republic of Iran
 Seyyed Bagher Ayatollahzadeh Shirazi – Architect and Iranian Science and Culture Hall of Famer in Heritage site repairs
 Homayoun Riahi Chaleshtari – Chairman of Zamyad Co. (2008–2009) and board member of Iran Khodro and SAIPA
 Mostafa Kavakebian, Iranian Reformist Politician and former parliament representative
 Hossein Allahkaram, Ansar-e Hezbollah activist
 Ali Akbar Saremi – Architect
 Karen Khanlari – Representative of Iranian parliament
 Karim Zareh – Former representative of Iranian parliament
 Hassan Mohadessi – Sociologist
 Jahanbakhsh Khanjani – Iranian Reformist Politician
 Ali Najafi Tavana – Iran Central Bar Association President
 Jalil Maleki – Iran Central Bar Association Board Member
 Isa Amini – Iran Central Bar Association Board Member
 Elaheh Koulaei – Former representative of Iranian parliament
 Ferdos Hajian – Primary school education expert

 Mohammad-Reza Rahimi – Vice President of Iran (2009–2013)
 Enshallah Rahmati – Journalist and Translator in Philosophy and theosophy
 Sadegh Zibakalam – Political analyst
 Effat Shariati – Iranian parliament representative
 Hamid Sajjadi – United Nations Intergovernmental Committee for Physical Education and Sport Vice-president
 Mohammad-Hossein Farhangi – Iranian parliament representative
 Habibollah Sadeghi – Painter
 Saeid Kharaghani – Iranian Ministry of Energy Deputy for Research & Human Resources (1998–2005)
 Ali Darabi, Islamic Republic of Iran Broadcasting Deputy
 Shabnam Gholikhani – Actress and Director
 Farhad Nazerzadeh Kermani – Iranian Science and Culture Hall of Famer in Arts
 Ahmad Bakhshayesh – Representative of Iranian parliament
 Hossein Abolhasan Tanhayi – Sociologist
 Mostafa Askarian – Pedagogian
 Mohammad Reza Sadegh – Senior Advisor to President Hassan Rouhani
 Abdollah Ramezanzadeh – Iranian Reformist Politician, governor of the Kurdistan Province under President Mohammad Khatami
 Abdolhossein Mokhtabad – Musician, Singer, Member of City Council of Tehran
 Shadi Azizi – Architect and Urbanist

Alumni 

As of June 2010, the university has 176,973 alumni which makes it the biggest number among all branches of Islamic Azad University. 

 Mohammad Abbasi – Iran Minister of Cooperatives (2005–2011) and Minister of Youth Affairs and Sports (2011–2013)
 Faezeh Hashemi – former representative of Iranian parliament and women rights activist
 Parvin Ahmadinejad – former member of City Council of Tehran
 Mohammad-Ali Pourmokhtar – Representative of Iranian parliament
 Mehdi Davatgari – Representative of Iranian parliament
 Rajab Rahmani – Representative of Iranian parliament
 Rahmatollah Norouzi – Representative of Iranian parliament
 Shabnam Gholikhani – Actress and Director
 Hanieh Tavassoli – Actress
 Shahrokh Razmjou – Archaeologist
 Elnaz Shakerdoust – Actress
 Kazem Sayahi – Voice actor
 Behdad Moghadasi – Guitarist
 Akbar Mohammadi Argi – Football coach
 Fariba Davoodi Mohajer – Journalist and activist

 Abbas Araghchi – Diplomat, Iranian Ambassador to Finland & Japan, Deputy Minister of Foreign Affairs
 Ali Shoroughi – Writer and Journalist
 Laleh Eskandari – Actress
 Bahareh Rahnama – Actress
 Azita Afrashi – linguist and Institute for Humanities and Cultural Studies fellow
 Mojtaba Saminejad – blogger and human rights activist
 Kambiz Hosseini – co-presenter of Parazit
 Shararh Farnejad – Musician and member of Arian Band
 Mehrab Ghasemkhani – Screenwriter
 Mahdi Pakdel – Actor
 Elnaz Shakerdoust – Actress
 Houman Haji-Abdollahi – Voice actor and IRIB Host
 Siamak Ansari – Actor
 Abolfazl Shahi – Artist
 Arash Dadgar – Theater Actor
 Hamed Behdad – Actor
 Marzieh Khakifirooz - Professor (Tecnologico de Monterrey)

Athletics 
Several students have won medals in International competitions while studying at the university.

Other notable sportspeople at the university include Ali Daei, Karim Ansarifard, Mohammad Mayeli Kohan, Akbar Mohammadi, Mahmoud Miran and Arash Miresmaeili.

References

External links 
 Official Website
 The Public Relations & Information of IAUCTB
 IEEE Student Branch Of IAUCTB Website
 Sorana automotive design team
 Hayyan Cultural Student society Website
 Computer Engineering Student society of IAUCTB Website

1982 establishments in Iran
Universities in Tehran
Educational institutions established in 1982
Central Tehran